Mohamed Lamine Yattara (born 28 July 1993) is a Guinean professional footballer who plays for Ligue 2 club Pau and the Guinea national team as a striker.

Early and personal life
He is brothers of Ibrahim Yattara and Naby Yattara.

Club career
Born in Conakry, Yattara has played club football for Lyon, Arles-Avignon and Troyes. He signed a new two-year contract with Lyon in July 2014.

On 17 July 2015, Yattara was bought by Belgian side Standard Liège for €2 million with a possible future share of profits made from Yattara's sale.

Yattara joined AJ Auxerre on loan in January 2017 for the remainder of the season.

He left Chinese club Sichuan Jiuniu in December 2021.

In August 2022 he signed for Pau FC.

International career
He made his international debut for Guinea in 2012 and was included in the nation's squad for the 2015 Africa Cup of Nations. In team's opening match, Yattara scored the opening goal as Guinea drew 1–1 with the Ivory Coast. In April 2015 he spoke about the national team.

Career statistics

Club

International

International goals
Scores and results list Guinea's goal tally first.

References

External links
 

1993 births
Living people
Association football forwards
Association football midfielders
Guinean footballers
Guinea international footballers
Guinean expatriate footballers
Ligue 1 players
Ligue 2 players
Championnat National 2 players
Championnat National 3 players
Belgian Pro League players
China League One players
Olympique Lyonnais players
AC Arlésien players
ES Troyes AC players
Angers SCO players
Standard Liège players
AJ Auxerre players
Sichuan Jiuniu F.C. players
Pau FC players
Expatriate footballers in China
Expatriate footballers in France
Expatriate footballers in Belgium
Guinean expatriate sportspeople in Belgium
Guinean expatriates in China
Guinean expatriate sportspeople in France
2015 Africa Cup of Nations players
2019 Africa Cup of Nations players